Bryce Williams (born February 2, 1993) is a former American football tight end. He was signed by the New England Patriots as an undrafted free agent in 2016. He played college football at East Carolina University after a brief tenure at Marshall.

College career

Marshall
Williams was an invited walk-on for the 2013 season and made the team at Marshall but was redshirted. At the end of the season he decided to transfer to ECU.

East Carolina
Williams played three seasons for the ECU Pirates and recorded 96 catches for 1,040 yards and 13 touchdowns. Williams was named to the American Athletic Conference All-Conference Second-team as a Junior in 2014 and the All-Conference First-team following his Senior season in 2015.

Professional career

New England Patriots
Williams signed with the New England Patriots as an undrafted free agent on May 6, 2016. He was waived by the Patriots on September 3, 2016.

Los Angeles Rams
On September 5, 2016, Williams was signed to the Los Angeles Rams' practice squad. He signed a reserve/future contract with the Rams on January 3, 2017 after spending his entire rookie season on the practice squad. On May 3, 2017, he was waived by the Rams.

Seattle Seahawks
Williams signed with the Seattle Seahawks on May 11, 2017. He was released on June 8, 2017.

Carolina Panthers
On August 3, 2017, Williams was signed by the Carolina Panthers. He was waived on September 1, 2017.

Arizona Cardinals
On April 11, 2018, Williams signed with the Arizona Cardinals. He was waived on September 1, 2018.

Arizona Hotshots
Williams signed with the Arizona Hotshots of the Alliance of American Football for the 2019 season. He was waived on February 21, 2019.

References

1993 births
Living people
American football tight ends
Arizona Cardinals players
Arizona Hotshots players
Carolina Panthers players
Los Angeles Rams players
New England Patriots players
Players of American football from Winston-Salem, North Carolina
Seattle Seahawks players